Ini Assmann was a German film actress of the 1960s and 1970s.

Selected filmography
 The Magnificent Tony Carrera (1968)
 Hugo, the Woman Chaser (1969)
 Death Knocks Twice (1969)
 Carnal Circuit (1969)
 Madame and Her Niece (1969)

References

Bibliography
 Cowie, Peter. Variety International Film Guide 1970. Tantivy Press, 1969.

External links

2015 deaths
German film actresses
1945 births